Claud Elliott Provincial Park is a provincial park in British Columbia, Canada located on northern Vancouver Island approximately  southeast of Port McNeill, between the Tsitsika River and Bonanza Lake, near the community of Woss.

The park was established in 1995, comprising 289 hectares.  Its boundary was extended in 2004 to a current total area of approximately 328 hectares.

Name origin
Claud Elliott Lake and Claud Elliott Creek were named for a Mr. Claud Elliott who was born in Lincoln County, Upper Canada in 1859.  Of United Empire Loyalist stock, the family moved to Bruce County.  He came to BC in June 1891 and in the summer of 1902 visited the north end of Vancouver Island for the first time.  He became closely involved with this location, cruising and selling timber lands in this area and later serving as alderman for the City of Vancouver. He died in November 1929.

See also
Claud Elliott Creek Ecological Reserve

References

Provincial parks of British Columbia
Northern Vancouver Island
1995 establishments in British Columbia
Protected areas established in 1995